

Hønefoss is a town and the administrative center of the municipality of Ringerike in Buskerud, Viken county, Norway. Hønefoss is an industrial center of inner Østlandet, containing several factories and other industry. As of 1 January 2022, Hønefoss had 16,547 inhabitants.
Between 1852 and 1964, the town was an independent municipality.

Hønefoss received town status and was separated from Norderhov into its own municipality in 1852. The town was built around the Hønefossen waterfall, from which the city derives its name. In 1964, Hønefoss ceased being a separate municipality and became part of Ringerike, where the town became its administrative center.

Hønefoss is a natural trading center for the populations of Ringerike, Hole, and Jevnaker. It is an inland town and a central hub in eastern Norway.

Etymology
The town is named after Hønefossen, a waterfall on the Begna River. The first element is the name of the old farm Hønen (Old Norse *Hœnvin), the last element is foss (waterfall). The name of the farm is a compound of a word *hœn- (with an unknown meaning) and vin (meadow).

Location
Hønefoss is located 63 kilometres northwest by road from the Norwegian capital of Oslo. Hønefoss  is situated north of Lake Tyrifjorden.  At Hønefoss, the Begna flows together with the Randselva river just below Hønefossen forming the Storelva river  which flows into  Nordfjord,  the upper west branch of Lake Tyrifjord.

Transportation
European route E16 runs near Hønefoss on its way from Oslo to Bergen. Hønefoss  is connected to Norwegian national road 35 (Rv 35) which passes  within town limits. Norwegian National Road 7 from Granvin in Hordaland ends at Hønefoss.

Hønefoss Station is located at the intersection between the Bergen Line (Bergensbanen), the Randsfjord Line and the Roa–Hønefoss Line. The rail station was opened in 1868 when the Randsfjord Line was extended from Tyristand to Randsfjord. The current station building was put into operation in 1909, in connection with the opening of the Bergen Line between Oslo and Geilo.

Economy
Hønefoss is home to several factories and other industry, with  Norske Skog Follum  maintaining its headquarters in the city. Dating from 1873,  Norske Skog Follum  was one of the largest producers of newsprint in Europe. The paper mill closed in 2012.

Ringerikes Blad is a regional newspaper covering Ringerike, Hole and Jevnaker. Established in 1845, the newspaper is published daily in Hønefoss. As of 2006, the newspaper has a daily circulation of 12,684. the newspaper is an affiliation of the media company, Amedia.

Climate
Hønefoss has a humid continental climate (Dfb) with relatively warm summers and cold winters with snow on the ground. The all-time high  was recorded July 2018. The all-time low  was recorded January 2010.

Sport
Hønefoss BK is a football club that as of 2016 plays in Norwegian Third Division.
Ringerike Panthers is located in Hønefoss, they play in the first tier of Norwegian hockey.

Cultural attractions

Ringerikes Museum (Ringerikes Museum) is located nearby in the former Norderhov Rectory. The museum is noted for its icon collection, its rune stones and its collection of the private belongings of Jørgen Engebretsen Moe. Jørgen  Moe was a Norwegian author, who is best known for the Norske Folkeeventyr, a collection of Norwegian folk tales which he edited in collaboration with Peter Christen Asbjørnsen.  It is affiliated with the Buskerud Museum (Buskerudmuseet).

Buskerud Photography  Archive  (Buskerud fylkesfotoarkiv) is a central archive for photography and photo-historical material from Buskerud. The archives accommodates approx. 200,000 photographs dating from the 1850s. Buskerud fylkesfotoarkiv has shared office space with the Ringerikes Museum in Norderhov and is affiliated with the Buskerud Museum (Buskerudmuseet).

Veien Cultural Heritage Park (Veien Kulturminnepark) is in located in Hønefoss. The park contains over 100 grave mounds from the Early Iron Age, as well as a  reconstructed longhouse and a museum. It is affiliated with the Buskerud Museum (Buskerudmuseet).

Ridder Farm (Riddergården) is located on the north side of Hønefoss. This had been a family farm dating to 1730. The farm was largely developed by Fredrik Ridder (1756–1798), who had inherited it from his father. This was also the home of the manager of the local sawmill for generations. Ringerike Municipality has managed the property  since 1964 in associated with Ringerike Museum.

Notable residents

 Anders Andersen (1846 in Hønefoss – 1931) a saw mill worker and politician
Erika Stang (1861-1898), composer
 Leif Dietrichson (1890 in Hønefoss – 1928) a Norwegian military officer and aviation pioneer
 Karsten Alnæs (born 1938 in Hønefoss) an author, historian and journalist 
 Per Inge Bjørlo (born 1952) a sculptor, painter and graphic designer, lives in Hønefoss
 Svein Olav Blindheim (born 1954) a jazz double bassist, composer and writer, lives in Hønefoss
 Geir Lippestad (born 1964 in Hønefoss) a controversial lawyer, politician and social activist
 Michele Waagaard (born 1980 in Hønefoss) a Thai model, pop star, actress and radio host
 Lars Fredrik Frøislie (born 1981 in Hønefoss) a musician, plays keyboards and drums
 Nils Bech (born 1981 in Hønefoss) a Norwegian singer
 Amal Aden (born 1983) Somali–Norwegian writer, lived in Hønefoss  since 2002
 Emilie Marie Nereng (born 1995 in Hønefoss) blogger, musician and model

Sport 
 Trygve Brodahl (1905 in Hønefoss – 1996) cross country skier
 Sverre Brodahl (1909–1998 in Hønefoss) a Nordic skier, team bronze and silver medallist at the 1936 Winter Olympics
 Frode Andresen (born 1973) Norwegian biathlete and cross-country skier, lives in Hønefoss
 Frode Lafton (born 1976) a former footballer, 523 caps with Hønefoss BK which he now manages 
 twins Anne Line Gjersem & Camilla Gjersem (born 1994) figure skaters
 Anders Jacobsen (born 1985 in Hønefoss)  ski jumper, team bronze medallist at the 2010 Winter Olympics, won the Four Hills Tournament
 Andrea Schjelderup Dalen (born 1992), professional ice hockey player for Djurgårdens IF and holder of the single season SDHL goal record

See also
Hønefoss Church

Gallery

References

External links
Ringerikes Museum

 Chamber of Commerce, Trade and Industry in Ringerike, Hole and Jevnaker Community

 
Cities and towns in Norway
Former municipalities of Norway
Populated places in Buskerud
Populated places established in 1852
1852 establishments in Norway